Rolf Koschorrek (17 June 1956 - 12 January 2020) was a German politician and a member of the CDU party from 1983.

Koschorrek was born in Bad Bramstedt, West Germany. After studying Dentistry in Göttingen, he worked as a dental technician and dentist, becoming a politician in 1990. From 2005 until 2013 he was a member of the German Bundestag.  In 2013 Koschorrek was not re-nominated as a member of the Bundestag for his electoral district, apparently because of his many other commitments.

Koschorrek was the father of one daughter. He died in Berlin, aged 63.

References

External links
 Website of Rolf Koschorrek
 Biography at CDU/CSU parliamentary group website

1956 births
2020 deaths
Members of the Bundestag for Schleswig-Holstein
People from Bad Bramstedt
Members of the Bundestag 2009–2013
Members of the Bundestag 2005–2009
Members of the Bundestag for the Christian Democratic Union of Germany